Events from the year 1378 in Ireland.

Incumbent
Lord: Richard II

Events
Mathew, son of Redmond de Bermingham, takes up station at Tallaght Castle to resist the O'Byrnes

Births